The 2022 Melbourne Summer Set 1 was one of two tournaments of the Melbourne Summer Set. The Melbourne Summer Set 1 featured an ATP Tour 250 tournament and a WTA 250 tournament, both played on hardcourts and as part of the 2022 WTA Tour.

Rafael Nadal won the men's singles title to earn his 89th career ATP title and his first in Australia since 2009. Simona Halep won the women's singles title to earn her 23rd career WTA title and first title in Australia.

Champions

Men's singles

  Rafael Nadal def.  Maxime Cressy 7–6(8–6), 6–3

Women's singles

  Simona Halep def.  Veronika Kudermetova 6–2, 6–3

Men's doubles

  Wesley Koolhof /  Neal Skupski def.  Aleksandr Nedovyesov /  Aisam-ul-Haq Qureshi 6–4, 6–4

Women's doubles

  Asia Muhammad /  Jessica Pegula def.  Sara Errani /  Jasmine Paolini 6–3, 6–1

Points and prize money

Point distribution

*per team

Prize money

ATP singles main draw entrants

Seeds

 1 Rankings are as of 27 December 2021

Other entrants
The following players received wildcards into the singles main draw:
  Nick Kyrgios
  Andy Murray
  Christopher O'Connell

The following player received entry as an alternate:
  Emil Ruusuvuori

The following players received entry from the qualifying draw:
  Ričardas Berankis
  Maxime Cressy
  Rinky Hijikata
  Andreas Seppi

The following players received entry as lucky losers:
  Sebastián Báez
  Henri Laaksonen

Withdrawals
Before the tournament
  Alexander Bublik → replaced by  Peter Gojowczyk
  Lloyd Harris → replaced by  Alex Molčan
  Ilya Ivashka → replaced by  Sebastián Báez
  Nick Kyrgios → replaced by  Henri Laaksonen
  Kei Nishikori → replaced by  Emil Ruusuvuori

During the tournament
  Tallon Griekspoor

Retirements
  Benoît Paire

ATP doubles main-draw entrants

Seeds

 1 Rankings are as of 27 December 2021

Other entrants
The following pairs received wildcards into the doubles main draw:
  Norbert Gombos /  Alex Molčan
  Marc Polmans /  Alexei Popyrin

The following pair received entry using a protected ranking:
  Altuğ Çelikbilek /  Yannick Maden

The following pairs received entry as alternates:
  Sebastián Báez /  Tomás Martín Etcheverry
  Facundo Bagnis /  Bernabé Zapata Miralles
  Altuğ Çelikbilek /  Yannick Maden
  Rinky Hijikata /  Christopher O'Connell
  Jozef Kovalík /  Sergiy Stakhovsky
  Jaume Munar /  Rafael Nadal

Withdrawals
Before the tournament
  Romain Arneodo /  Benoît Paire → replaced by  Jaume Munar /  Rafael Nadal
  Alexander Bublik /  Mackenzie McDonald → replaced by  Mackenzie McDonald /  Reilly Opelka
  Marco Cecchinato /  Andreas Seppi → replaced by  Altuğ Çelikbilek /  Yannick Maden
  Marcus Daniell /  Marcelo Demoliner → replaced by  Marcus Daniell /  Denis Kudla
  Lloyd Harris /  Alexei Popyrin → replaced by  Rinky Hijikata /  Christopher O'Connell
  Ilya Ivashka /  Andrei Vasilevski → replaced by  Jozef Kovalík /  Sergiy Stakhovsky
  Fabrice Martin /  Andreas Mies → replaced by  Romain Arneodo /  Andreas Mies
  Adrian Mannarino /  Hugo Nys → replaced by  Facundo Bagnis /  Bernabé Zapata Miralles
  Denys Molchanov /  David Vega Hernández → replaced by  Ričardas Berankis /  Denys Molchanov
  Marc Polmans /  Alexei Popyrin → replaced by  Sebastián Báez /  Tomás Martín Etcheverry

During the tournament
  Romain Arneodo /  Andreas Mies
  Jaume Munar /  Rafael Nadal

WTA singles main-draw entrants

Seeds

 1 Rankings as of 27 December 2021

Other entrants
The following players received wildcards into the singles main draw:
  Seone Mendez
  Lizette Cabrera
  Arina Rodionova

The following player received entry as an alternate:
  Lauren Davis

The following players received entry from the qualifying draw:
  Destanee Aiava
  Anna Bondár
  Nao Hibino
  Viktória Kužmová
  Lesley Pattinama Kerkhove
  Zheng Qinwen

The following player received entry as a lucky loser:
  Mai Hontama

Withdrawals
Before the tournament
  Camila Giorgi → replaced by  Lauren Davis
  Camila Osorio → replaced by  Mai Hontama
  Emma Raducanu → replaced by  Elena-Gabriela Ruse
  Jil Teichmann → replaced by  Maryna Zanevska

During the tournament
  Naomi Osaka

WTA doubles main draw entrants

Seeds

 1 Rankings as of 27 December 2021

Other entrants
The following pairs received wildcards into the doubles main draw:
  Destanee Aiava /  Lizette Cabrera
  Gabriella Da Silva-Fick /  Olivia Tjandramulia

The following pairs received entry as alternates into the doubles main draw:
  Desirae Krawczyk /  Christina McHale
  Aliaksandra Sasnovich /  Anastasija Sevastova

Withdrawals
Before the tournament
  Veronika Kudermetova /  Elise Mertens → replaced by  Desirae Krawczyk /  Christina McHale
  Elixane Lechemia /  Ingrid Neel → replaced by  Vivian Heisen /  Ingrid Neel
  Wang Xinyu /  Zheng Saisai → replaced by  Aliaksandra Sasnovich /  Anastasija Sevastova

During the tournament
  Daria Kasatkina /  Liudmila Samsonova

See also
 2022 Melbourne Summer Set 2

References

External links
 
 ATP tournament Official website
 WTA tournament Official website

2022 ATP Tour
2022 WTA Tour
2022 in Australian tennis
January 2022 sports events in Australia
Melbourne Summer Set